Montana or Montaña is the surname of:

 Allison Montana (1922–2005), New Orleans cultural icon who acted as the Mardi Gras Indian "chief of chiefs" 
 Bob Montana (1920-1975), cartoonist who drew the characters that launched Archie Comics
 Claude Montana (born 1949), French fashion designer
 Cyril Montana (born 1969), French writer
 Francisco Montana (born 1969), American tennis player
 Freddy Montaña (born 1982), Colombian road cyclist
 Gentil Montaña (1942–2011), classical guitarist and composer
 Íñigo López Montaña (born 1982), Spanish footballer
 Joe Montana (born 1956), American Hall-of-Fame retired National Football League quarterback
 John C. Montana (1893–1964), American mobster and city politician
 Jordi Montaña, Spanish academic
 Jorge López Montaña (born 1978), Spanish retired footballer
 José Fernández Montaña, (1842–1935), Spanish priest, jurist, linguist and historian
 Manny Montana, American actor
 Nate Montana (born 1989), American footballer
 Nick Montana (born 1992), American footballer
 Pietro Montana (1890–1978), Italian-American sculptor, painter and teacher
 Raúl Montaña (born 1971), Colombian road racing cyclist
 Saúl Montana (born 1970), Mexican boxer
 Vincent Montana Jr. (1928–2013), American composer, arranger and percussionist

Spanish-language surnames